Bo'ness Junction rail crash occurred at Bo'ness Junction in Falkirk.

The junction lies on the Edinburgh and Glasgow Railway between Falkirk and Linlithgow where the line to Bo'ness joined from the north near Manuel station.

On the morning of 27 January 1874 the East Coast Scotch express had been divided at Edinburgh and was due to pass the junction in two portions; the first bound for Glasgow at 07:02 and the second bound for Perth at 07:07, but were running some 8 minutes late. As soon as the Glasgow express passed, a goods train  waiting in sidings at the junction was shunted across onto the main line, when the Perth express collided with it. It is believed that the station staff mistook the late-running Glasgow train for the second Perth express. Signals should have prevented the disaster but it is believed they were incorrectly set. Only when the roar of the approaching express could be heard were the signals were put back to danger, but it was too late to prevent the collision in which 16 were killed and 28 injured. A road bridge near the point of impact was so badly damaged it had to be demolished.

The tragedy was heightened by the fact that the absolute block system which would have prevented the disaster (by preventing more than one train from occupying a section of route at the same time) was being installed at the time; and was due to be switched on only 10 days later.

References

Notes

Sources

Train collisions in Scotland
Railway accidents in 1874
1874 in Scotland
Transport in Falkirk (council area)
History of Falkirk (council area)
Accidents and incidents involving Edinburgh and Glasgow Railway
January 1874 events
Railway accidents caused by signaller's error
1874 disasters in the United Kingdom